Tom Kurucz (born c. 1947) is a former American football coach.

Coaching career

Chicago
Kurucz was the head football coach at the University of Chicago.  He held that position for the 1979 season.  His coaching record at Chicago was 2–6.

Assistant coaching and steroids
Kurucz later became an assistant coach for the South Carolina Gamecocks.  During his time at South Carolina, he was implicated in a steroid use scandal after an article in Sports Illustrated alleged that steroid use was widespread in the program.  After the article, Kurucz and two other assistant coaches, pleaded guilty to charges of illegally buying steroids. Kurucz also pleaded guilty to providing steroids to players.

Kurucz was the offensive coordinator at Baker University (Kans.) for two seasons, 1996-1997.

Head coaching record

References

Year of birth missing (living people)
Living people
Chicago Maroons football coaches
South Carolina Gamecocks football coaches